Year 134 (CXXXIV) was a common year starting on Thursday (link will display the full calendar) of the Julian calendar. At the time, it was known as the Year of the Consulship of Ursus and Varus (or, less frequently, year 887 Ab urbe condita). The denomination 134 for this year has been used since the early medieval period, when the Anno Domini calendar era became the prevalent method in Europe for naming years.

Events 
 
 By place 
 Roman Empire 
 A law improving the lot of free workers is passed in Rome. 
 Arrianus, Roman governor of Cappadocia, repulses an attack of the Alani, a nomadic tribe from southeastern Russia. 
 Summer – Sextus Julius Severus, Roman governor of Judea begins a campaign against the Jewish rebel strongholds in the mountains.
 The Romans retake Jerusalem. The largely-destroyed city is renamed Aelia Capitolina.

 Asia 
 Ilseong becomes ruler of the Korean kingdom of Silla.

 By topic 

 Architecture 
 Hadrian's Villa in Tivoli, Italy is completed.

Births 
 Dong Zhuo, Chinese general and warlord (d. 192)
 Marcus Macrinius Avitus Catonius Vindex, Roman politician (d. 176)

Deaths 
 Jima of Silla (or Jima Isageum), Korean ruler of Silla

References